Issiaka is a masculine given name. Notable people with the name include:

Issiaka Eliassou (born 1985), Malian footballer
Issiaka Fofana (born 1982), Ivorian cyclist
Issiaka Koudize (born 1987), Nigerien footballer
Issiaka Ouédraogo (born 1988), Burkinabé footballer

African masculine given names